The white-legged toktokkies (genus Dichtha) are ground-dwelling, Afrotropical beetles in the family Tenebrionidae. They are stout, black beetles of about 2 – 2.5 cm in length. The antennae and legs are covered in pale to brownish down. Like the related genus Psammodes, the adults tap out a rhythm on the ground to attract and locate mates. They feed on both plant and animal material. Some species, like D. inflata, may feign death.

Species
The species include:
 Dichtha cubica Guérin-Méneville, 1845 — White-legged toktokkie	
 Dichtha inflata Gerstaecker, 1854 — Red-backed toktokkie, Kafadala
 Dichtha modesta Robiche, 2013
 Dichtha transvalica Brancsik, 1914
 Dichtha quedenfeldti Kolbe, 1886

A catalogue of the Sepidiini tribe from 2019 considers Dichtha incantatoris Koch, 1952 a nomen nudum and therefore invalid. A likely source of this erroneous name is the popular Field Guide to Insects of South Africa by M Picker, C Griffiths & A Weaving. Specimens identified under this name are likely Dichtha cubica (see this explanation by iNaturalist curator Riaan Stals).

References

External links
 Dichtha, Global names index
 Dichtha, "Coleopterorum catalogus", W. Junk, Internet archive
 Dichtha cubica  Guérin-Méneville, 1845
 Dichtha inflata Gerstaecker, 1854
 Dichtha quedenfeldti Kolbe, 1886

Beetles of Africa
Pimeliinae
Tenebrionidae genera